M10 motorway may refer to:

M10 motorway (Great Britain), a former road in Hertfordshire, England
Karachi Northern Bypass, also known as the M10 motorway, a road in Pakistan
M10 highway (Russia), a road connecting Moscow and St. Petersburg

See also
List of highways numbered 10
M10 (disambiguation)